Congress House is the headquarters of the Trades Union Congress (TUC), a British organisation that represents most of the UK's trade unions. It is also an events venue, Congress Centre.

In 1948, David du Roi Aberdeen won an architectural competition to design the new TUC headquarters building in Great Russell Street, London. Staff began to move into the offices in 1956. Congress House was officially opened on 27 March 1958 along with the unveiling of a giant pietà-style statue of a woman holding her dead son. Carved in place in the internal courtyard by Jacob Epstein, it was intended as a memorial to the dead trade unionists of both world wars.

The front of the building is dominated by a bronze sculpture by Bernard Meadows representing the spirit of trade unionism with the strong helping the weak. The main facing material of the façade is polished grey Cornish granite.

Congress House was one of the earliest post-war buildings to be listed at Grade II*, in 1988.

In 2015, an ETFE roof was installed over the internal courtyard which enabled the glass roof of the conference centre below to be reinstated and affords protection to the Epstein statue.

In 2018, an extensive redevelopment of the rear of the building was carried out, creating a new entrance, reception, offices and staff facilities. Known as 'The Rookery', the new development includes a public artwork by German artist Eva Berendes inspired by traditional trade union badges.

Gallery

References

External links

TUC's webpage with details of the history of the building

Grade II* listed buildings in the London Borough of Camden
Office buildings completed in 1958
Trades Union Congress